North of the Great Divide  is a 1950 American western film directed by William Witney and starring Roy Rogers, Penny Edwards and Gordon Jones.

Plot
An Indian tribe, the Osekas, in the north-west near the Canadian border has been depending on the yielding of salmon fish out of a nearby river for centuries. They smoke them so as to have enough food supplies for the rest of the year. They enjoy a good relationship with The Royal Canadian mounted police. Roy Rogers, the singing hero, is one of their most important friends, he joins the bureau of Indian affairs so as to defend their way of life more easily. Mr. Banning informs the head man of the Indian Village, Nogura, that he is going to build a fish cannery in the vicinity next to the river. The Indians are afraid the cannery is going to take all the fish from the river and not enough will remain for them. Mr Banning wants to hire the Indians to work for him but they are busy catching salmon and making supplies.
As feared by the Indians the traps designed to catch salmon installed by the cannery catch all the fish and leave none to the Indians. The owner of the cannery suggests they move further north and start hunting. There is even a danger for the Indians to be removed into a reservation.
Roy Rogers comes to the rescue with a herd of cattle which will prevent them from starving. With Ann Keith, the good-looking district nurse, he takes all the necessary measures to avoid the possible breakout of a local Indian war, the Osekas threatening to rob the cannery industry. The task will be difficult since the managers of the cannery will not hesitate to do anything to defend their interests and make as much money as possible out of it. The foreman even suggests murdering Rogers. Mr Banning’s plan is however much more deceitful since he pretends to try and collaborate with Rogers, letting for example some of the fish go through for the Indians to catch them and even meeting them in an apparently friendly way. Things get worse when a Canadian Mountie is found dead and the Indian chief, having been seen taking salmon from traps, is suspected to be the murderer. This suits the foreman Stagg and Mr. Banning as they are the responsible people for that crime. Nevertheless they intend to murder Chief Nogura who knows they are guilty. Foreman Stagg wanted to burn down a Canadian competitor’s cannery and was caught red-handed by a Mountie, so he killed him. Fortunately their plans of murder are being overheard by one of Roy’s friends who can tell him. Roy brings Nogura to deputy sheriff Hartley’s custody and plans to prove that the Indian chief is innocent. The Indians feel all the more offended and Roy under pressure as sheriff Bradley feels the need to put Nogura into jail due to popular indignation. They break into the jail house to get Nogura out but the cell is empty since Banning and Stagg got him out first. Eventually Roy and his Indian friends manage to prove that Banning and Stagg schemed to burn down the Canadian cannery to improve their earnings and fulfill a huge contract ,even if it means overfishing, as well as put the blame on Nogura, who is finally proven not guilty. Just before a final shootout the head of The Mounted Police can witness the two greedy men’s try to set their competitor’s cannery on fire. Banning and Stagg get arrested, their plans to fish the river stream empty fail, the Osekas can go on with their way of life and all is well that ends well.

Cast
 Roy Rogers as himself
 Penny Edwards as Ann Keith
 Gordon Jones as Splinters Mcgonagle
 Roy Barcroft as Banning
 Jack Lambert as Henchman Stagg
 Douglas Evans as Mountie Sergeant
 Trigger as himself
 Keith Richards as Tacona
 Noble Johnson as Nagura
 Foy Willing as Singing Cowhand
 Iron Eyes Cody

External links
 

1950 films
1950 Western (genre) films
Royal Canadian Mounted Police in fiction
Films set in Canada
American Western (genre) films
Trucolor films
Republic Pictures films
Films directed by William Witney
1950s English-language films
1950s American films